The history of the Albania national football team dates back to the team's formation and first ever international match in 1946.

History

1930–45: Founding and early years
Although it never played any matches, the Albania national football team existed before the Albanian Football Association was created in 1930. This is witnessed by the registration of the Albanian team in the Balkan Cup tournament of 1929–1931, which started in 1929, a year before the creation of the association. Albania, however, eventually retired from the competition, before the competition itself started. FSHF was founded on 6 June 1930, and, in 1932, Albania joined FIFA (during the congress 12 June – 16 June), however no national team matches were registered until the first international match, a debut against Yugoslavia in 1946. In 1954, Albania was one of the founding members of UEFA.

1946: Champion of the Balkans

The early years oversaw a notably successful Balkan Cup in the 1946 campaign. Albania won the cup after overcoming Yugoslavia on level points but a better goal difference. The final match ended in a 1–0 win against Romania. Four days earlier, Albania had already beaten Bulgaria 3–1. Albania wasn't expected to participate, but the withdrawal of Greece from the tournament offered Albania a chance to join in the re-established post-war cup.

1958–68: Between the best 16 Teams of the continent

Albania did not participate in the qualifiers of the 1960 European Nations' Cup. Four years later, Albania competed in a Euro Cup competition and the only time Albania was between the best 16 teams of the continent, due to the matches against Greece being forfeited and Albania given walkover. In the first round Albania lost 4–0 to Denmark in the first leg, and while they won the second 1–0, they couldn't pass to the quarterfinals. At the end of the tournament Albania ranked 9th in Europe.

Albania took part in the qualifiers for the 1966 World Cup in England, with Northern Ireland, Netherlands and Switzerland. Albania's only point in the qualification round came from a 1–1 draw at home to Northern Ireland in Tirana, which denied Northern Ireland a place in the Finals.

In the qualifiers for the UEFA Euro 1968, Albania had a 0–0 home draw with West Germany that denied the Germans the participation to the tournament.

1964-72 Albania participating in Football at the Summer Olympics qualifying tournaments 

Albania would participate for the first time in their history at the 1964 Summer Olympics in the Men's qualification Tournament. In which the Albanians faced Bulgaria in the Preliminary round. Albania would lose both matches close with 0–1 against the Bulgarians, missing out on the next stage. Albania then participate for the second and last time in their Football history at the 1972 Summer Olympics held in Munich. In the Men's European Qualifiers they would face Romania in the play-off stage. In the first leg they lost with 2–1 away from home despite an equalizer scored by Medin Zhega in the 55th Minute of this match. At the second leg Albania faced the Romanians in the Qemal Stafa Stadium in Tirana. The Albanians started the match well as Panajot Pano puts Albania in front in the 29th Minute but once again they couldn't held on to the result. As Romania scored further two goals in the end, to beat Albania once more with 1-2 this time around.

1974–78: Hiatus
For unknown political reasons Albania did not participate in the qualifiers of the UEFA Euro 1976, FIFA World Cup 1978, and UEFA Euro 1980.

1980–84: Return to competitions and nearly Qualified for the World Cup in Mexico in 1986

After six years of virtually no international matches, Albania managed to return to international football, participating in the 1982 FIFA World Cup qualification. In Group 1, Albania managed to end above last place, which Finland got instead. They only win came in September 1980 against Finland thanks to the goals of Sefedin Braho and Millan Baçi.

In the 1984 European Championship qualifiers, Albania finished in last place in their group of five teams. In 8 matches, Albania got 2 points, with 2 draws, 6 losses, and no wins. On the other hand, Albania had some impressive results against bigger teams. They lost 0–1 away to Turkey with the goal being scored in the 86th minute. In the next two games, Albania tied Northern Ireland to a scoreless draw and lost 1–2 to Germany, both at home. In the last three matches, Albania tied Turkey in the Qemal Stafa Stadium and lost 2–1 to Austria in Tirana. The last game of the competition was an away game to Germany. After 22 minutes, Albania went ahead 0–1 with a goal by Genc Tomorri. However, they were tied one minute later, and after Genc Tomorri was sent off by the referee after a simulation of Rudi Völler, Albania had to play for 60 minutes with one man down. Eventually Albania lost 2–1 with the last goal being scored in the 79th minute.

In the 1986 FIFA World Cup qualification Albania would face in this qualification Belgium, Poland and their rivals Greece. In the first match they faced Belgium in Brussels. The Albanians lost with 3-1 despite the equalizer from Bedri Omuri in the 71st minute. Albania would face away from home against Poland in the Stadion Stali Mielec. They drew the result through goals from Bedri Omuri and even the leading goal from Agustin Kola with 2-1 but at the end Poland scored again. Albania missing out on their first win, in this qualification. After that Albania famously beat Belgium at home with 2–0 in the Qemal Stafa Stadium. The goals were scored by Mirel Josa and Arben Minga securing Albania their first and only win in this qualification. As Albania loss their next two games against Greece away with 2-0 and against Poland at home close with 0–1. Missing out close to qualify for the 1986 FIFA World Cup. In their last match they faced Greece at home in Tirana. They go in front by a goal from Bedri Omuri but they couldn't hold on as Greece equalized the result in the 54th minute. At the end playing a 1–1 draw. Despite finishing their campaign with four points in the third place. Albania came close to qualify as they nearly beat every opponent in this Group. It was their most successful FIFA World Cup qualification in the history of Albania.

1991–99: Transition years

Albania managed to get impressive results against Germany during this campaign with Germany winning both matches only by 2–1 and the winner coming only in the last minutes. Albania finished in last place with 2 wins, 2 draws and 6 losses due to having worse head-to-head results against Wales. However, Albania beat another country (Moldova) away in an international qualifying tournament for the first time.

In the 1998 World Cup, Albania was drawn in a 6-team group which included Germany, Portugal, Ukraine, Northern Ireland and Armenia, Albania finished last with 4 points, but showed some respective results against the bigger teams. Their two matches with Germany saw them lose 2–3 at neutral ground and 3–4 in Hannover, taking the lead in both games. Albania got a 1–0 win against Northern Ireland and a 1–1 tie against Armenia.

In a relatively easy group, Albania only won once at home against Georgia. However, they memorably drew Greece 0–0 at home, Norway 2–2 and Latvia 0–0 (both away). Albania also drew Latvia 3–3 at home. All the other matches were narrowly lost.

2000–05: Failed qualifying campaigns

After a loss to Finland, Albania won over Greece 2–0 with an own goal and a late goal of Ervin Fakaj. However, after that win, another 6 losses followed for Albania, which brought the Albanian Football Federation to think about hiring a foreign coach, 33 years after the last foreign coach, Luznikov, had led Albania in a Moscow tournament in 1959.

After a poor start in which Albania would draw at home against Switzerland with 1-1 by a goal from Edvin Murati but lose in the next match away against Russia with 4-1 despite an earlier equalizer scored by Klodian Duro Albania sacked his manager Giuseppe Dossena to replace him with German Hans-Peter Briegel for the following match  against Russia in the Loro Boriçi Stadium in Shkodër. In which the Albanians won deservedly with 3-1 through goals from Altin Rraklli, Altin Lala and Igli Tare to secure Hans-Peter Briegel in his debut match, as a manager his maiden win for Albania. He led Albania to an undefeated run at home matches by drawing against Republic of Ireland 0–0 and beating in the last match Georgia 3–1 by goals from Besnik Hasi, Igli Tare and striker Alban Bushi.  Despite the good results, Albania finished the group in the penultimate spot with eight points. Away Albania couldn't score any points, but managed to score 4 goals. Missing close out to the Playoffs stage by six points.

Two months after Greece beat Portugal to win the European Championship, Albania defeated Greece 2–1 at home by two quick goals from Edvin Murati and Adrian Aliaj, denting the Greeks' possibility to qualify. As the Albanians leading for the table for the first time in a qualification after this match. Albania went on to disappoint by losing to Georgia away and Denmark at home, before returning to winning ways by beating Kazakhstan 0–1 with a goal from Alban Bushi. Then, Albania played Ukraine, Turkey, and Greece, losing all three matches. Later Albania beat Georgia 3–2 by two goals from Igli Tare and one from Ervin Skela as well as beating Kazakhstan with 2–1 by goals from Florian Myrtaj and striker Erjon Bogdani. The last positive result for Albania in this qualification would be a 2–2 away draw with Ukraine where Bogdani scoring two surprising goals. At the end, Albania got 13 points, and four wins in their best result then. They surpassed for the first time in the history two nation's in the qualifying standings.

2006–10: Disappointing results under Barić and Haan

In the matches for the 2008 European qualifiers campaign, Albania have managed very good results as well as good team play in some matches compared to previous times. They started with a 2–2 away draw to Belarus, two wins against Luxembourg home and away (2–0, 3–0) and a 0–0 draw away to Bulgaria. They had two good matches against the Netherlands in both legs, although controversial refereeing  caused the matches to end up in two losses (2–1, 0–1). Other setbacks included a 0–0 draw against Slovenia and a 0–2 loss to Romania, both at home. Albania's hopes of qualifying mathematically ended when they failed to win over Slovenia away and managed another 0–0 draw. In the penultimate match at home against Bulgaria, Albania played wonderfully, but ended up in a very unlucky draw. After going ahead, they conceded in the dying minutes and later missed a penalty. In the last match at home, Albania was hugely disappointing, losing 2–4 against Belarus. Contrary to the popular belief that this would be the easiest match during the campaign, Albania not only missed a chance to break the points-record of all competitions but also produced a very lethargic performance in a rainy night. Albania's Euro campaign ended with a disastrous 6–1 away loss to Romania, which eventually resulted in the resignation of the coach Otto Barić and his assistant.

In December 2007, Football Association of Albania's president, Armand Duka, announced Arie Haan would replace Croatian-Austrian Otto Barić as Albania's head coach. Haan signed a two-year contract on 4 January 2008. On 14 March 2008, Albania was suspended from international football (FIFA and UEFA), due to heavy political interference in the Football Association. The suspension lasted 46 days.

With Haan as coach Albania started 2010 FIFA World Cup qualification with a 0–0 draw against Sweden at home. Four days later, the Albanians defeated Malta 3–0 with goals from Erjon Bogdani, Armend Dallku and Klodian Duro. On 11 October 2008, Albania lost 2–0 to Hungary in Budapest and then surprisingly drew 0–0 with Portugal in Braga. On 11 February 2009, Albania drew with Malta in Ta'Qali 0–0. Albania then lost 1–0 to Hungary at home on 28 March 2009 and 3–0 to Denmark in Copenhagen on 1 April 2009. In the home match against Portugal, Hugo Almeida scored early for Portugal, before Albania equalised with a goal from Erjon Bogdani. However, with just a few seconds left in the game, Bruno Alves scored the winner for Portugal, eliminating Albania. At the end of the campaign, Albania drew 1–1 against Denmark and lost 4–1 to Sweden. Haan was replaced by Croatian coach Josip Kuže in May 2009.

2011–13: Revival under De Biasi

Josip Kuže parted ways with Albania three years and a half after he started the job, and in December 2011, Italian coach Gianni De Biasi replaced him. Albania started the qualifiers well, notably defeating Cyprus with 3-1 by goals from Armando Sadiku, Edgar Çani and Erjon Bogdani as well as beating Slovenia at home with 1-0 by a goal from Odise Roshi. which was followed by an unprecedent away win at Norway in Oslo after a stunning goal from Hamdi Salihi. Albania would also draw against Norway at home despite leading the match with a goal from Valdet Rama, this match ending in a 1–1 draw. The team was at one point 2nd with 6 matches played and 4 to spare, but failed to be successful in the last four, losing away in Slovenia and Iceland, as well at home against Switzerland, and drawing in Cyprus. With De Biasi, the Albania national team reached an unprecedented high number of players, who although are ethnically Albanian, were not born in Albania, but either in Kosovo, or outside of Kosovo, while hailing from Kosovo Albania parents. In 2011–13, 14 Albanians of Kosovo origin were either part of the start-up team, or had received recent call-ups.

2014–16: Success at the European Championship

The qualifying draw took place on 23 February 2014. Albania was drawn in Group I along with Portugal, Denmark, Serbia, and Armenia. Qualifying matches started in September 2014. Albania started the qualifiers with a historic result as they beat group favourites Portugal 1–0 away thanks to a goal from Bekim Balaj. In the second match against Denmark at the newly renovated Elbasan Arena, Albania was on lead until the 82nd minute where Lasse Vibe equalized, with the match ending 1–1. In the next game against Serbia at Partizan Stadium, the match was abandoned in 42nd minute after several on and off the field incidents. Despite the violence by Serbia's hooligans against Albania at Partizan Stadium, Serbia was awarded the 3–0 victory after the decision by UEFA. The decision was appealed by both Serbia and Albania, but the decision was upheld by UEFA. Both associations then filed further appeals to the Court of Arbitration for Sport, and on 10 July 2015 the Court of Arbitration for Sport rejected the appeal filed by the Serbian FA, and upholds in part the appeal filed by the Albanian FA, meaning the match is deemed to have been forfeited by Serbia with 0–3 and they are still deducted three points.

In the fourth match against Armenia at home, Albania were behind from the 4th minute after an own goal from Mërgim Mavraj, but Mavraj equalized in the 77th minute with a powerful header. Four minutes later Shkëlzen Gashi  scored the winner, putting Albania in the 2nd position along with Denmark with 10 points. It was the first time that Albania ended the first part of the qualifiers in the second spot. Albania made history again by beating one-time world champions and UEFA Euro 2016 hosts France at the Elbasan Arena in the "Group I" friendly match. After a draw against Denmark, Albania clinched at least a play-off place. Despite losing to Portugal and Serbia, Albania defeated Armenia 3–0 in Yerevan and qualified for UEFA Euro 2016, its first appearance at a major men's football tournament after 50 years. For this achievement the entire team was bestowed the Honor of Nation Order by Albania's President Bujar Nishani. In addition to the qualification, Albania achieved a world record in terms of not conceding any away goals during the tournament, while scoring seven away goals.

After the Serbia–Albania match, the national team of Albania was given awards of honor and city recognition by the cities of Tirana, Vlore, Kamëz, and Bajram Curri for protecting the national symbols.

Albania lost 0–1 to Switzerland and 0–2 to hosts France. While they beat Romania 1–0 (their first win against Romania since 1947), the team finished last among the third-placed teams and didn't progress beyond the group stage.

2016–present: Post European Championship

Despite the UEFA European Championship's almost successful debut, Albania suffered massive setback. In 2018 World Cup qualification, Albania had been thrown into a tough group composing Spain and Italy. Albania, despite its passionate play, failed to reach the World Cup, falling to both Italy and Spain as well as a shocking 0–3 loss to Israel at home. During this era, their successful manager, Gianni De Biasi, resigned and Christian Panucci, another Italian, replaced him as coach of Albania. However, thing got little improved. Albania played poorly in the 2018–19 UEFA Nations League, winning only to Israel 1–0 and lost the remaining three, especially the devastating 0–4 defeat to Scotland at home. Panucci would be sacked after a 0–2 defeat to Turkey in the opening campaign for the UEFA Euro 2020 qualifying. Another Italian, Edoardo Reja, was appointed to help Albania to improve in a tough group, but improvement is still very little. The Albanian side continued to slump, suffering a 0–1 loss away to Iceland before managed to gain its second win against Moldova 2–0. Reja would lead Albania in their encounter against world champions France in Paris, where the Albanians suffered a devastating 1–4 loss, the match was also marred with controversy after Andorran anthem was mistakenly played instead of Albanian one. After the defeat, Albania managed one of its biggest feat in their qualification, beating 2018 World Cup participant Iceland 4–2 at home soil to keep the team on track. Despite this outcome, Albania's trip to Turkey became a nightmare, when the Albanians, despite its passionate display, lost 0–1 in final minutes because of defensive mistake, thus losing every chance to qualify for the UEFA Euro 2020. In the next match, Albania won comfortably 4–0 versus Moldova at Zimbru Stadium, achieving the fourth win in group; by doing so, Albania set two records: it was the biggest away win in competitive matches and the first time in history that Albania has scored three goals in the first half in competitive matches and second time overall, though it was not enough to prevent Albania from elimination.

References

External links
 Albania Football Association official profile
 Albania national team profile at UEFA.com

 
Albania national football teams
Albania